Nyctemera sonticum is a moth of the family Erebidae first described by Charles Swinhoe in 1892. It is found in the Philippines and Borneo (Sabah).

References

Nyctemerina
Moths described in 1892